Ice III is a form of solid matter which consists of tetragonal crystalline ice, formed by cooling water down to  at .

Different types of ice, from Ice II to Ice XIX, have been created in the laboratory at different temperatures and pressures.

See also 
 Ice, for other crystalline forms of ice

References 

 

Water ice